Cheryl Adrienne Browne Hollingsworth, Miss Iowa 1970, is a former ballet dancer who was the first  African American contestant in the history of the Miss America pageant (Miss America 1971) following the abolition of the pageant's rule number seven, instituted during the 1930s, which read: "contestants must be of good health and of the white race".

In 2000, Cheryl Browne Hollingsworth lived in Lithonia, Georgia, with her husband Karl. Both work in the financial industry and have two grown children.

Early life, Miss Iowa 1970, and Miss America 1971

Browne's father, Carl, was born in the West Indies and worked as a narcotics policeman for  Kennedy Airport's Port Authority. Her mother Mercedes, who is half Native American, managed a tuberculosis clinic at Triboro Hospital. Cheryl grew up in Jamaica, Queens New York with her three brothers." She studied dance for 16 years prior to the Miss America pageant.

Browne left New York to attend the Lutheran - based  Luther College in Decorah, Iowa at the advice of her minister. She stated in an interview that it was her first venture to the midwest. While she was an undergraduate there, Browne entered and won the local 1970 Miss Decorah Pageant which enabled her to compete in the Miss Iowa pageant held on June 13, 1970. Browne placed first in the swimsuit competition and performed an original ballet performance for the talent competition to the music of 'Scheherazade.' She beat the other 19 (white) contestants to win the title of Miss Iowa 1970. This win generated a strong response (some in support and some critical) to newspapers, the Miss Iowa pageant board, and to Browne herself. The criticisms ranged from her ethnic background to the fact that a non-native Iowan won the crown. According to The Register-Guard, Browne, herself, was "surprised that Iowa, with its conservative traditions, silent majority, and small black population (1 percent of the state's 1970 population of 2,800,000) was the first state to pick a black girl as its representative."

This backlash followed her to the Miss America 1971 pageant held on September 12, 1970. Browne drew attention from reporters and from security personnel in Atlantic City who maintained a visible presence during pageant rehearsals. In addition, the Women's Liberation Front demonstrated at the event. Brown was not a finalist, however, losing to Miss Texas 1970, Phyllis George. In August 1971, Browne traveled to Vietnam with George, Miss Nevada 1970, Vicky Jo Todd, Miss New Jersey 1970, Hela Yungst, Miss Arizona 1970, Karen Shields, Miss Arkansas 1970, Donna Connelly, and Miss Texas 1970 (George's replacement), Belinda Myrick. They participated in a 22-day United Service Organizations tour for American troops that began in Saigon. Browne later commented that she thought "it was one of the last Miss America groups to go to Vietnam."

Browne graduated from Luther College in 1972.

Photographs
Photographs taken at the MISS AMERICA U.S.O. SHOW to Vietnam in 1971
It Happened Here in New Jersey - Contains photograph of Cheryl Browne in the preliminaries prior to the Miss America 1971 pageant on September 8, 1970.

Further reading
Davis, Shirley. "History follows former Miss Iowa First black pageant winner recalls her crowning moment." Quad-City Times, October 19, 2000.
"Black New Yorker chosen Miss Iowa." The Register-Guard, July 5, 1970: 8E.
"Newly crowned Miss Iowa is 'shocked' at her own victory." Baltimore Afro-American (United Press International), June 27, 1970: 19.

References

External links
Cheryl Adrienne Brown - biography.com
 

Year of birth missing (living people)
Living people
Miss America 1971 delegates
Place of birth missing (living people)
American beauty pageant winners
Luther College (Iowa) alumni
20th-century American people